Giuseppe Nicolao (born 5 March 1994) is an Italian footballer who plays as a defender for  club Gubbio.

Career
He made his professional debut in the Serie B for Virtus Lanciano on 24 September 2013 in a game against Juve Stabia.

On 31 January 2022, Nicolao moved to Foggia.

On 24 January 2023, Nicolao signed a 1.5-year contract with Gubbio.

References

External links
 
 
 

1994 births
Living people
People from Nocera Inferiore
Sportspeople from the Province of Salerno
Footballers from Campania
Italian footballers
Italy youth international footballers
Association football defenders
Serie B players
Serie C players
Serie D players
S.S.C. Napoli players
S.S. Virtus Lanciano 1924 players
F.C. Esperia Viareggio players
U.S. Alessandria Calcio 1912 players
A.S. Melfi players
U.S. Ancona 1905 players
S.F. Aversa Normanna players
Pol. Olympia Agnonese players
Latina Calcio 1932 players
Calcio Foggia 1920 players
A.S. Gubbio 1910 players